Or Hsieh or Hsieh Er (January 1918 – 1995) was a Taiwanese physician, educator and politician. The first female surgeon from Taiwan, she was also one of the first group of women elected to the Legislative Yuan in 1948.

Biography
Hsieh was born in 1918 in Báng-kah, the second of four children of Hsieh Quan, who owned a restaurant. She attended Laosong Public School and Taihoku Prefectural Taihoku Third Girls' High School. She graduated in April 1935 as the third-best student in her class, after which she attended Tokyo Women's Medical College, graduating with honours in April 1940. She subsequently became the first Taiwanese woman to work as a surgeon, joining St. Luke's International Hospital in Tokyo. She returned to Taiwan in 1943, becoming an assistant professor in the medical department of the Taipei Imperial University.

While working at the university, Hsieh began reading the works of Lu Xun, Ba Jin and Lao She. She began discussing anti-Japanese action with a group of five others in a temple in Xizhi. However, they were arrested in 1944 and Hsieh was imprisoned and tortured. She was given the option of release as long as she co-operated with the Japanese authorities, but refused. She remained in prison until the end of World War II. After her release in September 1945, she opened the a surgical hospital in Taiping in November, providing free treatment for the poor.

In 1945 she joined the Kuomintang and set up the Taipei Women's Association. In March 1946 she was elected to Taipei City Council, becoming its only female member. She was a member of Taipei City Party Affairs Planning Committee between August and October 1946. She was a representative of Taiwan at the 1946  that drew up the Constitution of the Republic of China. Her surgical practice was destroyed following the February 28 incident after she made a radio broadcast downplaying the violence.

Hsieh contested the 1948 elections to the Legislative Yuan, becoming one of the first group of women elected to the Chinese legislature. However, the following year she left Taiwan, initially for Europe, before settling in the United States. She received a doctorate in public medicine from Columbia University, subsequently working at Oregon State Hospital and the New York State Department of Health, where she was deputy director.

She returned to Taiwan in 1991 and died in 1995.

References

1918 births
Women surgeons
Taiwanese women physicians
20th-century Taiwanese educators
Kuomintang Members of the Legislative Yuan in Taiwan
20th-century Chinese women politicians
21st-century Taiwanese women politicians
21st-century Taiwanese politicians
Members of the 1st Legislative Yuan
Members of the 1st Legislative Yuan in Taiwan
Columbia University alumni
Taiwanese expatriates in the United States
1995 deaths
20th-century Taiwanese physicians
Taiwanese surgeons
Taipei City Councilors
Scientists from Taipei
Academic staff of the National Taiwan University
Taiwanese prisoners and detainees
World War II prisoners of war held by Japan